Pachyrhamma is a genus of cave weta (New Zealand cave cricket, tokoriro) in the family Rhaphidophoridae, endemic to New Zealand.

Cook et al. (2010) found that Gymnoplectron and Turbottoplectron are synonymised with Pachyrhamma. They follow W.F. Kirby (1906) and Karny (1937) in treating Pachyrhamma as a neuter noun.

Ecology 

Members of the genus are detritivorous scavengers that inhabit dark, damp refugia such as hollow logs, overhangs and caves during the day. They become more active at night and venture into the surrounding undergrowth to forage. They consume various organic matter such as plant seeds, fungi, animal droppings, and dead animal tissue. They will cannibalise the remains of other dead weta, and may also attack still-living cave weta while they are vulnerable during ecdysis (shedding their exoskeleton).

Species
When Pachyrhamma is treated as a neuter noun, species names have a neuter suffix, e.g. -ceras rather than -cera, and -ense rather than -ensis.
 Pachyrhamma acanthoceras (Milligan) – Auckland cave weta
 Pachyrhamma chopardi Karny, 1935
 Pachyrhamma edwardsii (Scudder, 1869)
 Pachyrhamma fascifer (Walker)
 Pachyrhamma uncata Richards, A. M., 1959
 Pachyrhamma waitomoensis – Waitomo cave weta

References

Ensifera genera
Cave weta